Trackman is a 2007 Russian slasher film directed by Igor Shavlak.

Plot

Three men decide to rob a bank, having devised a plan of retreat across the abandoned tracks of a no-longer used section of the Moscow Metro. The group is led by former infantryman Grom. However, the heist spirals out of control and the raiders are forced to take hostages. They hide in the tunnels of subway with the hostages. They soon come at the mercy of the Trackman. The Trackman is a giant, who had been living in the Metro's catacombs for years. The group is methodically picked off by the Trackman, who gouges out their eyes. Grom is forced to accept that he must confront him in a  game of survival, in which there can be only one winner.

Cast
Dmitri Orlov as Grom
Svetlana Metkina as Katya
Aleksandr Vysokovsky as Pakhomov
Yuliya Mikhailova as Olga
Aleksei Dmitriyev as Trackman
Oleg Kamenshchikov as Irkut
Tomas Motskus as Kostya
 Igor Shavlak as Colonel

Release

Home media
The film was released on DVD in Canada by Maple Pictures and in the United States by Lionsgate Home Entertainment on October 14, 2008. The latter being released as a part of the company's eight-disk "Ghost House Underground Eight Film Collection".

Reception
Dread Central gave the film a score of 1.5 out of 5, calling it "[an] uninteresting slasher movie". Andrew Smith from Popcorn Pictures awarded the film a score of 4/10, writing, "There’s nothing overly wrong with Trackman and it’s not a complete dud but given its Russian origins, I was expecting a lot more than another derivative slasher. It’s got the atmosphere and it’s got the killer but it’s a chore to sit through and comes off feeling really lethargic, tired and uninspired."
Justin Felix from DVD Talk felt the film was a fairly standard slasher film and stated that the film wasn't memorable enough to warrant multiple viewings. Adam Hakari from ReelTalk Movie Reviews awarded the film 1.5 out of 4 stars, criticizing the film's "sluggish pacing",  and lack of visual flair.

References

External links

 

2007 films
2000s slasher films
2000s horror thriller films
2000s Russian-language films
Russian slasher films
Russian horror thriller films
20th Century Fox films
2007 horror films